Angelique or Angélique may refer to:

 Angélique (given name), a French feminine name

Arts and entertainment

Music 
 Angélique (instrument), a string instrument of the lute family
 Angélique, a 1927 opéra bouffe by Jacques Ibert
 "Angelique" (song), the Danish entry in the Eurovision Song Contest 1961, performed by Dario Campeotto
 "Angélique", a song by Theatre of Tragedy from the album Aégis
 "Angelique", a song by Badfinger from the album Magic Christian Music
 "Angelique", a song by Mike Oldfield from the album Light + Shade
 Angelique, the debut album by Yukie Nishimura

Other uses in arts and entertainment 
 Angélique (novel series), by Anne Golon
 Angélique, Marquise des Anges, a 1964 film adaptation directed by Bernard Borderie
 Angélique (film), a 2013 film adaptation directed by Ariel Zeitoun
 Angélique (play), by Lorena Gale
 Angelique (video game series), a cross-media franchise including video games, manga, and anime
 Angelique, a doll from the Groovy Girls product line

Other uses 
 Angélique (given name), a French feminine name
 Angelique (grape), another name for the French wine grape Mondeuse noire
 Marie-Joseph Angélique, an executed French slave known as "Angélique"
 Angélique, an absinthe produced by the distillers of La Clandestine Absinthe

See also 
 Angelic (disambiguation)
 Angelica (disambiguation)
 Angelika (disambiguation)